is a series of RPGs developed by Nippon Ichi Software. The three main games in the series are Rhapsody: A Musical Adventure, Little Princess: Marl Ōkoku no Ningyō Hime 2, and Tenshi no Present: Marl Ōkoku Monogatari.

The first two games were released on the PlayStation, whereas the latter was for the PlayStation 2. Until 2023, only Rhapsody was translated to English, and was published by Atlus in 2000. The other two games' scripts have been translated to English by fans. Official localizations of Rhapsody II: Ballad of the Little Princess and Rhapsody III: Memories of Marl Kingdom were announced by NIS America on January 30, 2023 as a part of Rhapsody: Marl Kingdom Chronicles, scheduled for a mid-2023 release.

Characteristics
Like most Nippon Ichi games, the Marl games feature bright, anime influenced graphics. All the games use 2D backgrounds and sprites, with the exception of Tenshi no Present, which has 3D backgrounds with 2D sprites. Each of the games were created by Yoshitsuna Kobayashi and feature the artwork of Yoshiharu Nomura, whereas the music was composed by Tenpei Sato, a regular for handling Nippon Ichi games. Sato described Rhapsody's music as a "complete musical with both solos and choruses" and said "...it was a fun and refreshing experience."

The Marl games, similar to other Nippon Ichi video games, feature goofy senses of humor, tongue-in-cheek melodrama, and quirky casts of heroes and villains. For instance, Cornet, in Rhapsody, attacks enemies with monstrous storms of confectionery foods, while her rival, the seemingly polite Etoile, pulls out machine guns on her enemies. Along with the humor, there is a certain level of girlishness to each game, the plot often focusing on issues of love rather than complex politics and demon lords. Each game also features musical numbers.

Each of the Marl video games, with the exception of the puzzle games, are role-playing video games. Rhapsody and Little Princess are geared to be simpler RPGs, focusing more on story than complex gameplay, while Tenshi no Present's gameplay has more depth in it.

Games

Rhapsody
Rhapsody: A Musical Adventure (Marl Kingdom: The Adventure of the Puppet Princess in Japanese) was the first Marl Kingdom game. It was released on PlayStation on December 17, 1998, in Japan and on July 30, 2000, in the USA and was remade for the Nintendo DS in 2008. The game became an instant cult classic among fans and never gained much popularity in the mainstream. This game was also one of the first Nippon Ichi games to feature the anime art style and to have an offbeat sense of humor that has become a staple for the games Nippon Ichi has released.

In this game, Cornet, a young puppeteer, and her puppet friend Kururu face off against the almost menacing Marjoly and her minions in a battle over the prince. Battles are fought in a tactics fashion. This is the only Marl game to use this style. There are also a few musical numbers featured in the game, sung by various characters.

Little Princess
Little Princess: Marl Ōkoku no Ningyō Hime 2 (Puppet Princess of the Marl Kingdom 2: Little Princess in English, localized as Rhapsody II: Ballad of the Little Princess) was the second in the series. It was released on November 25, 1999, and was only released in Japan for the PlayStation. Like the game before it, Little Princess was released three times.

After Rhapsody, Cornet and her prince have a child and call her Kururu, after Cornet's friend. The game follows Kururu's adventures. Little Princess dumps the tactics battles for a more traditional RPG system. Musical numbers are also included.

Little Princess is also the first of the Marl series to be featured for download via the PlayStation Store in Japan. The download became available on May 31, 2007. This version can be played on either the PSP or PlayStation 3.

Tenshi no Present
Tenshi no Present: Marl Ōkoku Monogatari (Angel's Present: A Marl Kingdom Story in English, localized as Rhapsody III: Memories of Marl Kingdom) was the third game in the Marl series. It was released on December 21, 2000, in Japan for the PS2. This was the only main Marl game to come out on the PS2 and was the last Marl game, and unlike the other two games, Tenshi no Present has only one release date. Upon release, there was a limited edition version, however.

Tenshi no Present, instead of focusing on just one story, is broken up into chapters similar to Dragon Quest IV, each with its own story and characters, including ones from previous games. The battle system recycles the traditional RPG one, adding the ability to have characters on the side lines, aiding the main party.

Marl Kingdom: Happy Hunt
Marl Kingdom: Happy Hunt, is considered a minor sequel to Rhapsody: A Musical Adventure. It is a Japanese only Mobile Web game released on June 4, 2001, and ran until it's discontinuation in 2005.

It had a monthly fee of 300 yen (approximately 3 US dollars) and consisted of three chapters and one post-game bonus chapter. There was reportedly no music or sound. The story takes place after the original Rhapsody: A Musical adventure, where Cornet has been crowned Queen of Marl Kingdom. And follows a similar plot to the original. It follows a new character, Chocolat, who lives with her Grandmother Cocone in a wax figure museum in the Bavarois Plateau and tries to find her own prince(Prince Lunin of Carrot Kingdom) with the help of her puppet friend, MIG. The players visit Mother Green, Panna Cotta Village, the Rain Festival, and a cooking competition to get the prince's attention.

This game has been long considered lost media, as the game disallowed replaying chapters- and was then lost completely when it was eventually replaced with previous games in the series. Due to how primitive social media was at the time, any screenshots posted by former players and news sites have since broken, and walkthroughs/description of the third chapter and post game chapter are lost entirely. With the only existing details of the games plot and chapters having come from players that have posted it online.

Rhapsody: Marl Kingdom Chronicles
Rhapsody: Marl Kingdom Chronicles is a compilation of Rhapsody II: Ballad of the Little Princess and Rhapsody III: Memories of Marl Kingdom scheduled to be released in summer 2023. It is the first time that both titles will receive official English translations. The battle system for both titles have also been overhauled.

Puzzle games

Two other Nippon Ichi games, Marl Jong and Marl de Jigsaw, featured Marl Kingdom characters. Marl Jong, for the PlayStation, is a Mahjong game with Marl elements. Marl de Jigsaw, for the PlayStation 2, is a puzzle game, where the player must assemble jigsaw puzzles, along the lines of Pieces. Similarly to most games in Japan, games with Marl characters could be played on cellphones.

Other games
Several games developed by Nippon Ichi are often considered to be part of the Marl Kingdom world, such as Disgaea: Hour of Darkness and Makai Kingdom. In particular, La Pucelle: Tactics takes place in the same world, but at a different time in history and location and features the grandson of Cornet.  A grown-up version of Elly from Angel's Present also makes an appearance. Antiphona no Seikahime: Tenshi no Gakufu Op.A, a musical RPG for the PSP, also takes place in the same world.  Players can travel to Marl's Kingdom, and Marjoly and the Nyankos make an appearance.

Merchandise
The Adventure of Etoile Rosenqueen from Marl Kingdom is an "audio book" that chronicles the rivalry between Cornet and Etoile in between the first and second games which was released in 2006. Tenpei Sato composed the music for it and it was only released in Japan.

RosenQueen.com, named after Etoile Rosenqueen from the Marl games, was an online division of NIS America that sells various games and merchandise concerning the NIS games. In late 2010, however, they closed down RosenQueen, and made the merchandise shop a generic part of the NIS site.

The series also has calendars, soundtracks, phone cards, novels, comics, and plushies.

Reception
Rhapsody has retained a cult following, but remains mostly unheard of in mainstream video gaming. With an emphasis on girlish themes and musical numbers, Rhapsody gained little popularity with the gaming industry in America. However, in Japan, the series went on to have two sequels and sold well. Examples such as the cellphone gaming indicate that the Marl series is treated just as any other RPG series in Japan, whereas more of an oddity in North America.

Other Nippon Ichi games such as the Disgaea series, which are sometimes considered to be part of the Marl Kingdom world, have gained a large amount of popularity in America, years after Rhapsody was released. These games continue with the humorous approach to story telling and feature similar sugary character designs.

See also
Cultural differences in role-playing video games

References

 
Video game franchises
Video game franchises introduced in 1998